Popular Democrats is a small political party in Sweden. It was founded in 1991 by a group dissatisfied with the right wing turn of the Swedish Social Democratic Party. The party opposes EU membership. It is unclear whether the party is still active, but it is still registered with the electoral authorities.

The party is led by John Andersson in Ronneby.

The party has contested the elections to the national parliament (2002: 12 votes, 1998: 109 votes, 1994: 1 vote). In 1998 it contested municipal elections in Fagersta 0.22% (18 votes, 0 seats), Arvika 0.18% (28 votes, 0 seats), Ronneby 0.17% (32 votes, 0 seats) and Uppsala 0.01% (12 votes, 0 seats).

Members of Folkdemokraterna used to have contacts with the Swedish affiliate of the Lambertist ILCWI.

Minor political parties in Sweden